The premiership of Danielle Smith began on 11 October 2022 when she was sworn in by Lieutenant Governor of Alberta, Salma Lakhani. Smith won the 2022 United Conservative Party leadership election to replace then Alberta Premier Jason Kenney on October 6, 2022, and was appointed as the 19th Premier of Alberta. Her cabinet was sworn in on 22 October.

2022 United Conservative Party leadership election

Smith won the 2022 UCP leadership election on October 6, 2022 defeating six candidates with 53% of the UCP caucus vote. The 30th Alberta Legislature was constituted on 11 October 2022. 

She won the bi-election as MLA for Brooks-Medicine Hat on November 8, 2022.

Cabinet and Office of the Premier

On October 21, 2022 the cabinet was sworn in by the Lieutenant Governor of Alberta, Salma Lakhani. Ministers in the newly formed cabinet who had held key ministries and responsibilities during the Premiership of Jason Kenney, included Jason Copping as Minister of Health, Tyler Shandro as Minister of Justice, Adriana LaGrange as Minister of Education, Demetrios Nicolaides as minister of Minister of Advanced Education, and Rick Wilson as Minister of Indigenous Relations.

By October 21, the total roster of 27 cabinet members and their eleven secretaries represented nearly "two-thirds of the entire governing United Conservative Party caucus. This includes Kaycee Madu and Nathan Neudorf as Deputy Premiers of Alberta on 21 October, Matt Jones as Minister of Affordability and Utilities, Nate Horner as Minister of Agriculture and Irrigation, Mickey Amery as Minister of Children's Services, Jason Luan as Minister of Culture, Peter Guthrie as Minister of Energy, Sonya Savage as Minister of Environment and Protected Areas, Travis Toews as Minister of Finance and President of Treasury Board, Todd Loewen as |Minister of Forestry, Parks and Tourism]], Brian Jean as Minister of Jobs, Economy and Northern Development, Nicholas Milliken as Minister of Mental Health and Addictions, Rebecca Schulz as Minister of Municipal Affairs, Mike Ellis as Minister of Public Safety, Jeremy Nixon as Minister of Seniors, Community and Social Services, Dale Nally as Minister of Service Alberta and Red Tape Reduction, Nate Glubish as Minister of Technology and Innovation, Rajan Sawhney as Minister of Trade, Immigration and Multiculturalism, Rajan Sawhney, and Devin Dreeshen as Minister of Transportation and Economic Corridors who were also sworn in on October 21.

Bill 1

As promised in her election campaign as a contender for the leadership of the UCP replacing then Alberta Premier Jason Kenney, the first piece of legislation Premier Smith introduced on the first day of the fall sitting of the 4th Session of the 30th Alberta Legislature was Bill 1: Alberta Sovereignty Within a United Canada Act, commonly known as the Alberta Sovereignty Act. It was introduced on 29 November 2022 on the first day of the fall sitting of the 4th Session of the 30th Alberta Legislature by Premier Smith and passed on December 8, 2022. The final requirement before it passes into law is the royal assent, which is mostly viewed as ceremonial. Lieutenant Governor Lakhani told media on 2 September, after Smith had announced her intention to introduce Bill 1, that she would be seeking legal advice before giving assent to the Act, in order to ensure she would be "do[ing] the right thing for our people and for our Constitution".

The Act was a key component of Smith campaign during the United Conservative Party (UCP) leadership election in 2022, contributing to her election as UCP leader and appointment as Premier of Alberta.

Bill 2
Affordability and Utilities Minister Matt Jones introduced Bill 2: Inflation Relief Statutes Amendment Act on 7 December. If passed, Bill 2 would provide targeted relief through monthly cash payments of $100 to some families and seniors with combined incomes of less than $180,000 following submission of applications. Opposition Shannon Phillips said that the bill as it stands reflects a "back-of-the-napkin approach" lacking critical details while neglecting many who struggle with their finances.

Ministry of Health
Included in Health Minister Jason Copping's 14 November mandate letter from Premier Smith, was a reminder to consider the affordability crisis and inflation in decisions related to the eleven expectations or commitments listed in the health portfolio. First on the list was a call to assess and reform the health care system including the Health Quality Council of Alberta (HQCA) and Alberta Health Services (AHS). This includes an immediate response to issues such as lengthy ER wait times and EMS response times.

Ministry of Justice
The two top priorities in the mandate letter to Minister Tyler Shandro were the Alberta Sovereignty Act and amendments to the Alberta Human Rights Act (AHRA) to protect people from losing their jobs because of COVID-19 vaccination and/or booster status. An amendment to AHRA if passed, would allow complaints to be made Alberta Human Rights Commission if a denial of work, housing or other services was related to their vaccine status. If the complaint were considered valid they would then advance to the Alberta Human Rights Tribunal where an assessment would be made. The Tribunal may find that "vaccination was a justifiable requirement for the workplace, facility, or service in question".

See also
 Premiership of Jason Kenney
 Premiership of Doug Ford
 Alberta Sovereignty Within a United Canada Act
 30th Alberta Legislature
 Alberta Energy Regulator
 Alberta Geological Survey
 Alberta Health Services
 Alberta Human Rights Commission
 Alberta Municipal Government Board
 Alberta Oil Sands Technology and Research Authority
 Alberta Parks
 Economy of Alberta

Citations

References

 
 
 
 
 
 
 </ref>
 
 
 
 
 
 *

External links
 Premier of Alberta Official Site
 

Premiers of Alberta
Smith, Danielle
Politics of Alberta
Alberta Legislature
Alberta provincial legislation
2022 establishments in Alberta